Delay Point is a rocky bluff rising to  on the west side of Melba Peninsula, about  west of Cape Charcot. It was discovered by the Australasian Antarctic Expedition under Mawson, 1911–14, and so named by the Eastern Sledge Party of the Western Base because bad weather delayed the party near here for several days in November 1912.

References

Headlands of Queen Mary Land